Digitate or filiform warts are warts that often appear on the eyelids, lips, face, or neck.

The warts tend to grow directly outwards from the skin. They have a spiky, thread-like or finger-like appearance. They sometimes look and feel like tiny brushes, making them especially uncomfortable for the patient.

As with other wart types, a number of treatments are available, including laser therapy, cryotherapy, salicylic acid, and other topical treatments.

References

Papillomavirus-associated diseases